Ring finger protein 167 is a protein that in humans is encoded by the RNF167 gene.

Function

RNF167 is an E3 ubiquitin ligase that interacts with TSSC5 (SLC22A18; MIM 602631) and, together with UBCH6 (UBE2E1; MIM 602916), facilitates TSSC5 polyubiquitylation (Yamada and Gorbsky, 2006 [PubMed 16314844]).[supplied by OMIM, Mar 2008].

References

Further reading